Rugby is an unincorporated community in Las Animas County, in the U.S. state of Colorado.

History
A post office called Rugby was established in 1900, and remained in operation until 1947. The community was named after Rugby, in England, the native land of a local mining official.

References

Unincorporated communities in Las Animas County, Colorado
Unincorporated communities in Colorado